Yaggy is an unincorporated community in Reno County, Kansas, United States.  It is located northwest of Hutchinson, west of Willowbrook, near a railroad.

History
Yaggy had a short-lived post office ca. 1901.

Education
The community is served by Nickerson–South Hutchinson USD 309 public school district.

References

Further reading

External links
 Reno County maps: Current, Historic, KDOT

Unincorporated communities in Reno County, Kansas
Unincorporated communities in Kansas
1901 establishments in Kansas